Allan Ayala Acevedo (born July 7, 1986) is a male track and field athlete from Guatemala, specialized in the 400m intermediate hurdles event. As a junior, he was a member of the team that broke the Guatemalan 4x400 relay Junior National Record in 2004.

In 2007, Ayala ran for Dickinson State University in North Dakota and was named Outstanding DAC Conference Track Athlete in both indoors and outdoors events. He was runner-up in the 400IH in the NAIA national championships; also setting a new Guatemalan national record in the event. Three weeks later he set the 400 meters Guatemalan national record in Costa Rica. He then broke his own record in the 400IH at Rio de Janeiro, Brazil. Ayala was also the only Guatemalan to run in the 2007 World Athletic Championships in Osaka, Japan.

Achievements

References

External links
 

1986 births
Sportspeople from Guatemala City
Guatemalan male sprinters
Guatemalan male hurdlers
Pan American Games competitors for Guatemala
Athletes (track and field) at the 2007 Pan American Games
Athletes (track and field) at the 2011 Pan American Games
World Athletics Championships athletes for Guatemala
Living people